is a Japanese former professional football player.

He is currently the chairman of the Blaublitz Akita, a Japanese association football team based in Akita, Akita.

References

External links

1981 births
Living people
Nihon University alumni
Association football people from Ibaraki Prefecture
Japanese footballers
J3 League players
Blaublitz Akita players
Association football defenders